Rukmini is a Hindic feminine given name that may refer to the following notable people:
Rukmini Bhaya Nair, Indian linguist, poet, writer and critic 
Rukmini Callimachi (born 1973), Romanian-American journalist
Rukmini Chaudhary, Nepalese politician
Rukmini Devi Arundale (1904–1986), Indian theosophist, dancer and choreographer
Rukmini Lakshmipathi (1892–1951), Indian independence activist
Rukmini Maitra, Indian model and actress
Rukmini Sukarno (born c.1943), a daughter of the Indonesian President Sukarno
Rukmini Varma (born 1940), Indian artist
Rukmini Vijayakumar, Indian choreographer, dancer and film actress

See also
Rukmani (name)

Indian feminine given names